All Day Everyday is the fourth studio album by American rap group South Central Cartel. It was released on June 3, 1997 via Rush Associated Labels. Recording sessions took place at Echo Sound and Kitchen Sync Studio in Los Angeles.

Track listing 
 West Coast Gangstas
 I'm a Rider
 Niggas Git Dealt Wit
 It Don't Stop
 All Day Everyday
 Hit the Chaw
 G's Game
 4 Yo Ear
 W.C. Rocks
 Can I Roll Wit U
 Da Bomb
 Champagne Wishes
 Funk U Up
 No Get Bacc
 Gangsta Luv Pt.2
 S.C.G.'z
 Family Thang

Sample credits
"4 Yo Ear"
"(Not Just) Knee Deep" by Funkadelic
"She Talks to Me With Her Body" by The Bar-Kays
"Can I Roll Wit U"
"Let Me Down Easy" by The Isley Brothers
"Champagne Wishes"
"Never Too Much" by Luther Vandross
"Da Bomb"
"Caravan of Love" by Isley-Jasper-Isley
"Shake You Down" by Gregory Abbott
"Funk U Up"
"Funk You Up" by Sequence
"Gangsta Luv Pt. 2"
"Computer Love" by Zapp
"G's Game"
"This Is Your Life" by Commodores
"Hit The Chaw"
"Wishing on a Star" by Rose Royce
"It Don't Stop"
"Let's Get It On" by Marvin Gaye
"SCG'z"
"Dance Floor" by Zapp
"W.C. Rocks"
"For the Love of You" by The Isley Brothers
"Genius of Love" by Tom Tom Club
"West Up!" by WC and the Maad Circle featuring Westside Connection

Chart history

References

External links

1997 albums
South Central Cartel albums
Def Jam Recordings albums
Albums produced by Prodeje
G-funk albums